Jan Szembek (11 July 1881 – 9 July 1945) was a Polish diplomat, one of the most influential ones in the final years of the Second Polish Republic and a close associate of Józef Beck.

Early life
Szembek was born in a szlachta family on 11 July 1881 in the village of Poręba, near Alwernia. He graduated from the Vienna University and took up the post of an Austrian government clerk in Bosnia (1905-1908). In 1908, he settled in Kraków.

Diplomatic career
In 1919, after Poland regained independence from the partitions of Poland, Szembek was named chargé d'affaires and later he was the Polish ambassador in Budapest (1921-1924), Brussels (1925) and Bucharest (1927), where he remained until 1932. After returning to Poland, he took up the job of deputy secretary in the Ministry of Foreign Affairs in Warsaw.

After the invasion of Poland, he left Poland on 17 September 1939, along with other members of the government. His home, in the village of Mloszowa, near Trzebinia, was ransacked by the Germans, who also burned Szembek's personal library. He died on 9 July 1945 in Estoril, near Lisbon.

Bibliography
Szembek wrote two books:
 Diariusz i teki Jana Szembeka 1934 - 1939, t. 1 - 4, London 1964 - 1972
 Jan Szembek Diariusz. Wrzesien-Grudzien 1939, Wydawnictwo PAX Warszawa 1989,

Decorations and awards
 Commander's Cross with Star of the Order of Polonia Restituta
 Medal Decades of Independence Regained
 Grand Cross of the Order of the Southern Cross (Brazil)
 Order of the Oak Crown (Luxembourg)
 Grand Cross of the Military Order of Christ (Portugal)
 Order of the Crown (Romania)
 Order of the Star of Romania
 Order of Merit of the Republic of Hungary, 1st class
 Grand Cross of the Order of the Crown of Italy
 Order of the White Star, 1st class (Estonia)

Sources
Młoszowa at mloszowa.mbp.trzebinia.pl
Ibidem - Zrodla do historii Polski XIX - XX w.(przypisy) at www.ibidem.com.pl

External links
Szembek's announcement to ambassadors of Great Britain and France, issued in Warsaw on August 29, 1939

1881 births
1945 deaths
People from Chrzanów County
Diplomats of the Second Polish Republic
Commanders with Star of the Order of Polonia Restituta
Recipients of the Order of the Crown (Romania)
Knights of the Order of the Crown (Romania)
Recipients of the Order of the Star of Romania
Grand Crosses of the Order of Christ (Portugal)
Grand Crosses with Chain of the Order of Merit of the Republic of Hungary (civil)
Recipients of the Order of the White Star, 1st Class
Ambassadors of Poland to Romania
Ambassadors of Poland to Belgium
Ambassadors of Poland to Hungary
University of Vienna alumni